Corkscrew is a steel roller coaster at Valleyfair in Shakopee, Minnesota featuring one vertical loop and two corkscrews. Built in 1980, Corkscrew was planned to reflect the design of its sister roller coaster Corkscrew at Cedar Point. It is notably one of the first roller coasters to feature a double corkscrew, as well as a vertical loop. The main differences that the Valleyfair model has is the addition of a finale helix and the omission of the camelback before the loop. Until the hypercoaster Wild Thing (the fifth highest and fastest roller coaster in the world at the time it opened in 1996), Corkscrew was the only outdoor all-steel roller coaster in Minnesota. Corkscrew is currently the only roller coaster at Valleyfair with inversions. The coaster's track was painted blue when it opened in 1980, but was repainted orange and yellow in 2011.

Ride experience 
After exiting the station and turning 180 degrees right, the train engages the lift hill and climbs to 85 feet in the air. After this, the ride drops directly into a vertical loop. This is followed by a short hill. After the hill, there is a rise and a banked right turn, leading into a double-corkscrew element. Exiting the second corkscrew, the ride goes over a small hill banked to the right, followed by an upward helix. The ride then makes a short left turn to align with the station and goes into the brakes.

Sister coaster 

The older Corkscrew at Cedar Point is the same height and has the same inversions in the same order, but has a somewhat different layout. Cedar Point's model drops off the lift into a hill, followed by the loop. Rather than going into a short hill leading into an elevated banked turn like Valleyfair's Corkscrew, the Cedar Point Corkscrew goes up a rather high hill with a flat top, before swooping over the midway into the double corkscrews. (The Valleyfair model has a smaller hill, which comes after the loop rather than before and does not have the flat-topped hill.) Cedar Point's model omits the helix.

External links
Official page

Roller coasters introduced in 1980
Roller coasters operated by Cedar Fair
Roller coasters in Minnesota
Valleyfair